Rodney Maibam Hansen  (born March 1966) joined Gloucestershire Constabulary as Deputy Chief Constable in May 2013 and in May 2017 took over as Chief Constable.

Hansen started his career at Avon and Somerset Constabulary in September 1988 in the market town of Chipping Sodbury. During his time with the force he covered a variety of roles from patrol Inspector in central Bristol to District Commander for Bath and North East Somerset. Other postings also led to him working on the force surveillance team and reviewing the child protection team portfolio.

Hansen has been a hostage negotiator since 1998 and for a number of years was the South West Regional Co-ordinator for negotiating. He was course director for the regional negotiators course and in October 2003 trained negotiators within the Greek police service in preparation for the 2004 Olympic Games in Athens.

He is also the Chief Police Advisor to the military Joint Task Force Headquarters (JTFHQ) and part of a multi-agency team of non-military advisors working closely alongside colleagues from the Stabilisation Unit, Department for International Development, Foreign and Commonwealth Office and a variety of volunteer and charitable groups such as the International Red Cross.

His deployments to date include: Somalia to help devise the next phase of the United Nations (AMISOM) plan to bring security to the wider Horn of Africa, the Masai Mara, Kenya, working with Kenyan and Ugandan Rapid Deployment Forces on flood relief, food assistance programmes, malaria and refugee reduction. Rod also assisted in the fast time provision of a UK police capability to assist the British military in extracting British nationals from Libya during the recent fall of the regime. Op Ruman was the largest UK military operations since Afghanistan, and Rod assisted in providing IPRC support following Hurricanes Maria and Irma in the Caribbean, and the subsequent humanitarian crisis.

Hansen is also the current National Police Chiefs Council lead for aviation, mounted policing.

Hansen was awarded the Queen's Police Medal (QPM) in the 2020 Birthday Honours.

References

Living people
Hostage negotiators
1966 births
British Chief Constables
English recipients of the Queen's Police Medal